Hasan Ziyayi, also known as Ziyayi Chelebi (died 1585), was a Bosnian poet who wrote in Persian and Turkish. He was one of the earliest and most talented Bosnian divan poets that flourished in the 16th century. Regarding his Persian works; he wrote a qasida and fourteen ghazals as well as a qet'a. He dedicated his qasida to Persian poets and was well versed in the Persian litarary tradition. He hailed from Mostar.

References

People from Mostar
1585 deaths
Date of birth unknown
16th-century Persian-language poets
16th-century Bosnian people
Bosnian Muslims from the Ottoman Empire
16th-century poets from the Ottoman Empire
Male poets from the Ottoman Empire
Bosnia and Herzegovina poets